This is a list of Kazakh football transfers in the winter transfer window 2020 by club. Only clubs of the 2020 Kazakhstan Premier League are included.

Kazakhstan Premier League 2020

Astana

In:

Out:

Caspiy

In:

Out:

Irtysh Pavlodar

In:

Out:

Kairat

In:

Out:

Kaisar

In:

Out:

Kyzylzhar

In:

Out:

Okzhetpes

In:

Out:

Ordabasy

In:

Out:

Shakhter Karagandy

In:

Out:

Taraz

In:

Out:

Tobol

In:

Out:

Zhetysu

In:

Out:

References

Kazakhstan
2019–20
Transfers